The 2013 Chinese FA Super Cup (Chinese: 2013中国足球协会超级杯) was the 11th Chinese FA Super Cup. The match was played at the Tianhe Stadium on 3 March 2013, contesting by Super League and FA Cup double winners Guangzhou Evergrande and Super League runners-up Jiangsu Sainty.

Jiangsu Sainty defeated Guangzhou Evergrande 2–1, thus winning their first ever Chinese FA Super Cup title.

Match

Details

References

External links
 

FA Super Cup
2013
Sports competitions in Guangzhou
Guangzhou F.C. matches
Jiangsu F.C. matches